The Ozone Zeno is a French single-place paraglider that was designed by the Ozone R&D Team and has been produced by Ozone Gliders of Le Bar-sur-Loup, France, since 2016.

Design and development
The aircraft was designed as a competition glider for expert-level pilots and is produced in four sizes to match pilot weight ranges. It is a two-line design, with only A and B risers. The B-risers have wooden handles for rear-riser control.

The glider is made from a combination of 27g Porcher Sport Skytex 27 Classic and Dominico 30D fabrics. Of the choice of fabric the company says, "it is important to note that due to the extensive use of light materials in this wing, it is less durable than an M6, for example. These lightweight and high performance materials require care and caution on the ground."

Operational history

Reviewer Seb Ospina described the Zeno in a 2017 video review as comparable in performance to the Enzo 2, but more demanding to fly, saying "like all two-liners, it can potentially bite". He termed it "cohesive" and "solid". Hugh Miller described it as taking some time flying it to get used to its different flying characteristics.

Hugh Miller also did a written review for Cross Country magazine in which he advised caution for pilots considering a move up to the Zeno, "in conclusion, I know far more pilots who've changed up wings too quickly and got scared than pilots who’ve got better. My advice would be to think about it seriously before stepping onto a Zeno as your first EN-D, and if you’re worried about it, give yourself an easier entry into EN-D.".

Variants
Zeno S
Small-sized model for lighter pilots. The glider model is EN D certified.
Zeno MS
Medium small-sized model for meid-weight pilots. The glider model is EN D certified.
Zeno ML
Medium large-sized model for mid-weight pilots. The glider model is EN D certified.
Zeno L
Large-sized model for heavier pilots. The glider model is EN D certified.

Specifications (Zeno ML)

References

External links

Zeno
Paragliders